Marlies Wagner (born 25 May 1983) is an Austrian luger who has competed since 1999. A natural track luger, she won two medals in the mixed team event at the FIL World Luge Natural Track Championships (Silver: 2001, Bronze: 2007).

Wagner also won a bronze in the mixed team event at the FIL European Luge Natural Track Championships 2010 in Sankt Sebastian, Austria.

References
FIL-Luge profile
Natural track World Championships results: 1979-2007

External links

 

1983 births
Living people
Austrian female lugers
20th-century Austrian women
21st-century Austrian women